The Amyrgians (Ancient Greek:  ; Latin: ; Old Persian:   "Sakas who lay hauma (around the fire)") were a Saka tribe.

Name

Identification
The country of the  may have been the same place named as Mujavant in Indo-Aryan literature, where it appears in close connection with Gandhāra and Bahlika.

Geography
The  most likely lived somewhere between the Caspian Sea and the Pamir Mountains, and to the north of the Oxus, near the Bactrians and Sogdians, possibly in the region corresponding to modern-day Tashkent or Dushanbe around Fergana, or across a large region stretching from Margiana to the upper Oxus river, or between the Altai and Pamir mountains, or in the territory corresponding to the modern-day Afghan district of Monjan in the upper Kokcha valley.

Other possible locations of the  include the Fergana valley itself, or both the Fergana and Alay valleys, or the region to the north of the Iaxartes.

History
According to the Greek historian Ctesias, once the Persian Achaemenid Empire's founder, Cyrus, had overthrown the Median king Astyages, the Bactrians accepted him as the heir of Astyages and submitted to him, after which he founded the city of Cyropolis on the Iaxartes river as well as seven fortresses to protect the northern frontier of his empire against the Saka. After this, Amorges's queen, Sparethra, defeated Cyrus with a large army of both men and women warriors and captured Parmises, the brother-in-law of Cyrus and the brother of his wife Amytis, as well as Parmises's three sons, whom Sparethra exchanged in return for her husband, after which Cyrus and Amorges became allies, and Amorges helped Cyrus conquer Lydia.

After Cyrus had been mortally wounded by the Derbices and their Indian allies, Amorges and his Saka army helped the Persian soldiers defeat them. Cyrus told his sons to respect their own mother as well as Amorges above everyone before dying.

Legacy

See also
 Orthocorybantians
 Indo-Scythians
 Kambojas
 Komedes
 Sogdia
 Skudra

References

Sources

 
 
 
 

Scythian tribes
Tribes described primarily by Herodotus